Edwin Leslie King SC (25 September 1929 – 28 May 2015) known as 'Sharkey', was a judge of the High Court of South Africa and Judge President of the Western Cape High Court.

Early life and education
King was born in London on 25 September 1929 and immigrated to South Africa as a young child. He was educated at Western Province Preparatory School where he started as a boarder in 1936, aged six and in 1943 he went on to St. Andrew's College in Grahamstown. King received his tertiary education at the University of Cape Town where he obtained his law degree.

Career
King started practicing as an advocate at the Cape Bar in 1956. In 1977 he took silk and continued to practice until 1986. Shortly after taking silk and in 1978, he was appointed acting judge for the first time. He regularly serves as acting judge, also at the Natal Provincial Division and in 1986 he was permanently appointed as judge of the Cape Provincial Division of the Supreme Court.

In 1994 he served on the Special Electoral Court which oversaw the 1994 South African elections. In 1997 King was appointed Deputy Judge President of the Western Cape High Court and in 1998 he was appointed Judge President of the court. He retired in 2000.

King Commission
On 5 May 2000, the South African president Thabo Mbeki appointed a Commission of Inquiry into Cricket Match Fixing and Related Matters, with King as chairman. The commission, known as the King Commission, investigated the issue of match-fixing by various South African cricketers and received wide publicity, partly as a result of the actions of the South African captain Hansie Cronje.

References

1929 births
2015 deaths
20th-century South African judges
University of Cape Town alumni
Alumni of St. Andrew's College, Grahamstown